Mouse wheel may refer to;
 a hamster wheel
 a treadmill
 a treadwheel
 the scroll wheel of a computer mouse